Jean Antoine Giral (1700–1787) was an 18th-century French architect from Montpellier. He designed a number of buildings and structures in this city.

Works 
 1715 Château de la Mogère, Montpellier
 1723 Hôtel de Cambacérès, Montpellier
 1723 Château de Bonnier de la Mosson, Montpellier
 1732 Hôtel Allut, Montpellier
 1739 Collégiale Saint-Jean, Pézenas
 1746 Saint Charles Hospital, Montpellier. Demolished in 1932.
 1747 Market Hall on the Place des Castellane, Montpellier. Demolished in 1858.
 1747 Hôtel St-Côme, Montpellier
 1748 Church of Notre-Dame-des-Tables, Montpellier
 1750 Facade of the Château de Castries, Castries
 1750 Hôtel-Dieu Saint-Eloi, Montpellier
 1754 Château de Cassan, Roujan
 1757 Hôtel Haguenot, Montpellier
 1767 Bridge in Villeneuve-lès-Maguelone
 1768 , Montpellier
 1772 Aqueduc Saint-Clément, Montpellier
 1776 Hôtel de Guilleminet, Montpellier

References

18th-century French architects
1700 births
1787 deaths
People from Montpellier